(born June 24, 1955) is a Japanese economist and the Harold H. Helms '20 Professor of Economics and Banking at Princeton University. He is especially known for proposing several models that provide deeper microeconomic foundations for macroeconomics, some of which play a prominent role in New Keynesian macroeconomics.

Career
He received a B.A. from University of Tokyo in 1978. After receiving his doctorate in economics from Harvard University in 1985, Kiyotaki held faculty positions at the Univ. of Wisconsin–Madison, the Univ. of Minnesota, and the London School of Economics before moving to Princeton.

He is a fellow of the Econometric Society, was awarded the 1997 Nakahara Prize of the Japan Economics Association and the 1999 Yrjö Jahnsson Award of the European Economic Association, the latter together with John Moore. In 2003, Kiyotaki was elected a Fellow of the British Academy (FBA), the United Kingdom's national academy for the humanities and social sciences. He is also a fellow of the European Economic Association. Thomson Reuters lists Kiyotaki among the 'citation laureates' who are likely future winners of the Nobel Prize in Economics.

Kiyotaki also received the Stephen A. Ross Prize in Financial Economics together with John Moore. In 2020 he was awarded the BBVA Foundation Frontiers of Knowledge Award in the category "Economics, Finance and Management".

Contributions
In 1987, together with Olivier Blanchard, Kiyotaki demonstrated the importance of monopolistic competition for the aggregate demand multiplier. Most New Keynesian macroeconomic models now assume monopolistic competition for the reasons outlined by Blanchard and Kiyotaki.

Later, Kiyotaki worked with Randall Wright to construct a model of the role of money, showing how money increased economic efficiency by permitting trade of many different types of goods which might not be traded under a system of barter. This model, which formalized William Stanley Jevons' insight about the double coincidence of wants as a barrier to economic activity under barter, has come to be known as the Kiyotaki–Wright model.

In 1997, with John Moore, Kiyotaki constructed a model to show how small shocks to the economy might be amplified into large output fluctuations through the interaction between real estate prices and restrictions on the availability of credit. This model of 'credit cycles' is now known as the Kiyotaki–Moore model.

Selected publications

Journal articles

References

External links
 Nobuhiro Kiyotaki's webpage at Princeton

1955 births
Living people
People from Osaka
20th-century Japanese economists
21st-century Japanese economists
Macroeconomists
Financial economists
New Keynesian economists
University of Tokyo alumni
Harvard University alumni
University of Wisconsin–Madison faculty
University of Minnesota faculty
Academics of the London School of Economics
Princeton University faculty
Fellows of the British Academy
Fellows of the Econometric Society
Persons of Cultural Merit
Japanese expatriates in the United States
Fellows of the European Economic Association